The Vickers VC.1 Viking is a British twin-engine short-range airliner derived from the Vickers Wellington bomber and built by Vickers-Armstrongs Limited at Brooklands near Weybridge in Surrey. After the Second World War, the Viking was an important airliner with British airlines, pending the development of turboprop aircraft like the Viscount. An experimental airframe was fitted with Rolls-Royce Nene turbojets and first flown in 1948 as the world's first pure jet transport aircraft. Military developments were the Vickers Valetta and the Vickers Varsity.

Design and development

The Ministry of Aircraft Production ordered three prototype Wellington Transport Aircraft to Air Ministry Specification 17/44 from Vickers-Armstrongs Limited. The specification was for a peacetime requirement for an interim short-medium haul passenger aircraft to serve until the more advanced designs specified by the Brabazon Committee (in particular, the Airspeed Ambassador and Armstrong Whitworth Apollo) could be developed. To speed development the aircraft used the wing and undercarriage design from the Wellington but the fuselage was new. Although the original contract referred to Wellington Transport Aircraft, on completion, the name Viking was chosen.

The first prototype (designated the Type 491 and registered G-AGOK) was built by the Vickers Experimental Department at its wartime Foxwarren dispersal site and was first flown by 'Mutt' Summers at Wisley Airfield on 22 June 1945. This aircraft crashed on 23 April 1946 due to a double engine failure; no fatalities occurred as a result of the crash. Following successful trials of the three prototypes the Ministry of Aircraft Production ordered 50 aircraft. The first BOAC aircraft flew on 23 March 1946. The prototypes were then used for trials with the Royal Air Force which led to orders for military versions (the Viking C2 (12 ordered as freighter/transports) and the modified Valetta C1).

The initial 19 production aircraft (later designated the Viking 1A) carried 21 passengers, they had metal fuselages and - except for the wing inboard of the nacelles - fabric-clad geodetic wings and tail units. Following feedback from customers, the next 14 examples, known as the Viking 1, featured stressed-metal wings and tail units. The next variant, the Viking 1B, was 28 in (71 cm) longer, carrying 24 passengers with up-rated Bristol Hercules piston engines, achieved a production run of 115. One of this batch was changed during production to so that it could be fitted with two Rolls-Royce Nene turbojet engines, with its first flight on 6 April 1948.

On 25 July 1948, on the 39th anniversary of Blériot's crossing of the English Channel, the Type 618 Nene-Viking flew Heathrow–Paris (Villacoublay) in the morning carrying letters to Bleriot's widow and son (secretary of the FAI), who met it at the airport. The flight of  took only 34 minutes. It then flew back to London in the afternoon. In 1954 it was bought from the Ministry of Supply and underwent the substantial conversion to Hercules 634 piston engines by Eagle Aviation to join their fleet.

All Vikings featured a tailwheel undercarriage.

The 58th Viking (c/n 158) became the prototype of the military Valetta, of which 262 were produced for the RAF. When production of this strengthened but externally similar type ended in 1952, a flying classroom version with tricycle undercarriage was already being delivered to the Royal Air Force (RAF), called the Varsity. All but one of those entered RAF service, the other example going to the Swedish Air Force. The production of 161 Varsities kept the Hurn works busy until January 1954, and they enjoyed a long service life. Examples are preserved at Brooklands Museum, the Imperial War Museum Duxford and the Newark Air Museum.

Operational history

The first Viking was flown from Vickers' flight test airfield at Wisley, Surrey, by chief test pilot Joseph "Mutt" Summers on 22 June 1945 and the third aircraft built was delivered to BOAC at Hurn near Bournemouth on 20 April 1946. Upon the delivery of nine examples to BOAC for development flying, including the two remaining prototypes, British European Airways (BEA) was established on 1 August 1946 to operate airliners within Europe and these first VC.1 Vikings were transferred to the new airline.

After a trial flight from Northolt to Oslo on 20 August 1946 by the newly formed BEA, the first regular Viking scheduled service commenced between Northolt and Copenhagen Airport on 1 September 1946.

In all 163 Vikings were built. The initials "VC" stood for Vickers Commercial, echoing the "VC" precedent set by the earlier Vimy Commercial of 1919. Vickers soon ceased to use the 'VC' letters, instead using type numbers in the 49x and 600 series, which indicated the specific customer airline.

BEA operated their large fleet of Vikings on many European and UK trunk routes for eight years. From 1951, the remaining fleet was modified with 36, instead of 27 seats, and named the "Admiral Class". BEA operated the Viking until late 1954, when the last was displaced by the more modern and pressurised Airspeed Ambassador and Vickers Viscount.

BEA sold their Vikings to several UK independent airlines for use on their growing scheduled and charter route networks. Some were sold to other European operators. An ex-BEA Viking 1B was fitted out as a VIP aircraft for the Arab Legion Air Force, mainly for the use of the King of Jordan. Most Vikings had been retired from service by the mid-1960s and the sole surviving example in the UK is owned by Brooklands Museum where it is under long-term restoration.

Variants
Viking
Prototypes with two 1,675 hp (1,250 kW) Bristol Hercules 130 engines, three built.
Viking 1A
Initial production version with geodetic wings and two 1,690 hp (1,261 kW) Bristol Hercules 630 engines.
Viking 1
Production aircraft with stressed skin mainplanes and two 1,690 hp (1,261 kW) Bristol Hercules 634 engines.
Viking 1B
Viking 1 with "long nose", 113 built.
Nene Viking
One Viking 1B aircraft modified for trials with two 5,000 lbf (22.3 kN) Rolls-Royce Nene I turbojets.
Viking C2
British military designation of the Viking 1; VIP transport aircraft for the King's Flight of the RAF.
Valetta C1 & C2
Modified design with strengthened floor and large freight door.
Varsity T1
Highly modified Valetta design with tricycle undercarriage for navigation and crew training.

Type numbers
Type 491
First prototype
Type 495
Second prototype
Type 496
Third prototype
Type 498
Viking 1A for British European Airways. Three later to Argentine Air Force.
Type 604
Viking 1B for Indian National Airways with two Hercules 634 engines.
Type 607
Valetta prototype for Ministry of Supply with two Hercules 230 engines.
Type 610
Viking 1B for British European Airways.
Type 613
Projected fuel transport variant, not built.
Type 614
Viking 1 for British European Airways.
Type 615
Viking 1 for the Argentine government with two Hercules 634 engines.
Type 616
Viking 1 for Central African Airways.
Type 618
Nene Viking for Ministry of Supply.
Type 620
Viking 1 for the Argentine government with two Hercules 630 engines.
Type 621
Viking C2 for the Royal Air Force with two Hercules 130 engines.
Type 623
Viking C2 for the Royal Air Force with two Hercules 134 engines. Two ordered for use by the King's Flight for a royal tour of South Africa, one aircraft for the King and one for the Queen.
Type 624
Viking C2 for the Royal Air Force with two Hercules 134 engines. One ordered for use by the King's Flight for a royal tour of South Africa for use by the state officials in 21-seat configuration.
Type 626
Viking C2 for the Royal Air Force with two Hercules 134 engines. One ordered for use by the King's Flight for a royal tour of South Africa as a mobile workshop support aircraft.
Type 627
Viking 1B for Airwork Limited.
Type 628
Viking 1B for DDL with two Hercules 634 engines.
Type 631
Projected 34-seat variant, not built.
Type 632
Viking 1B for Air India with two Hercules 634 engines.
Type 634
Viking 1B for Aer Lingus with two Hercules 634 engines.
Type 635
Viking 1B for South African Airways with two Hercules 634 engines.
Type 636
Viking 1B demonstrator.
Type 637
Valletta C1 for the Royal Air Force with two Hercules 230 engines.
Type 639
Viking 1 for Hunting Air Transport.
Type 641
Viking 1 for Suidair International
Type 643
Viking 1 for Suidair International with two Hercules 630 engines.
Type 644
Viking 1B for Iraqi Airways.
Type 649
Viking 1B for Pakistan Air Force with two Hercules 634 engines.
Type 651
Valetta C1 for the Royal Air Force with two Hercules 634 engines.
Type 657
Viking 1A conversions from Type 498 for BSAAC.

Operators

Civil operators

 
 Aerolíneas Argentinas
 Argentine Civil Aeronautics Board
 Flota Aérea Mercante Argentina
 LADE
 
 Aero Transport
 
 Aviameer Airlines
 
 DDL
 
 Misrair
 
 Airnautic
 Air Dauphine
 Air Inter
 Air Sahara
 Europe Aero Service
 Transportes Aeriens Reunis
 
 Aero Express Flug
 Aerotour
 Colombus Luftreederei
 Condor
 Deutsche Flugdienst
 LTU International
 Transavia Flug
 
 Air India
 Indian Airlines
 Indian National Airways
 
 Iraqi Airways
 Iraq Petroleum Transport Company
 
 Aer Lingus
 
 Kuwait Oil Company
 
 Bernado Pasquelle
 Government of Mexico
  (Portuguese India)
 Transportes Aéreos da Índia Portuguesa
 
  Governor General of Pakistan. Personal plane of Quaid E Azam Muhammad Ali Jinnah
 
 Protea Airways
 South African Airways
 Suldair International Airways
 Trek Airways
 United Airways

 
 Central African Airways
 
 Balair
 
 British West Indian Airways

 
 African Air Safaris
 Air Ferry
 Air Safaris
 Airwork Services
 Autair
 Bembridge Air Hire Limited
 BKS Air Transport
 Blue-Air
 British European Airways
 British Overseas Airways Corporation (used only by BOAC development flight)
 Eagle Aviation/Eagle Airways
 British International Airlines
 British Nederland Airservices
 Channel Airways
 Continental Air Services
 Crewsair Limited
 Decca Navigator Company
 Dragon Airways
 Eros Airlines (UK)
 Falcon Airways
 Field Aircraft Services
 First Air Trading Company
 Hunting Air Transport
 Hunting-Clan Air Transport
 Invicta Airways / Invicta International Airways
 Independent Air Transport
 James Stuart Travel Limited
 Maitland Drewery Aviation
 Meredith Air Transport
 Orion Airways
 Overseas Aviation
 Pegasus Airlines
 Tradair Limited
 Trans World Charter
 Vendair Limited

Military operators
 
 Argentine Air Force - 30 aircraft. One (T-64, ex LV-XFM) used as presidential aircraft from 1948 to 1952.
 
 Royal Australian Air Force - One Viking C2 in service from 1947 to 1951.
 No. 2 Squadron RAAF
 No. 34 Squadron RAAF
 
 Arab Legion Air Force
 Royal Jordanian Air Force
 
 Pakistan Air Force
 
 Royal Air Force
 Empire Test Pilots' School
 The King's Flight, RAF

Accidents and incidents

Of the 163 aircraft built 56 aircraft were lost in accidents – the following were some notable accidents:
 
 
 
 
 
 
 
 
 
  The aircraft carried 34 boys and 2 members of staff from The Archbishop Lanfranc School in Croydon.

Aircraft on display

Of the 163 Vikings produced, 6 survive; five can be found in museums around the world, while an additional airframe is in storage.

Argentina
 T-9 – Viking 1B on static display at the Museo Nacional de Aeronáutica de Argentina in Morón, Buenos Aires.

Austria
 G-AGRW – Viking 1A currently stored outdoors at Bad Vöslau airfield, Austria.

Pakistan
 J-750 – Viking 1B on static display at the Pakistan Air Force Museum in Karachi, Sindh.

Switzerland
 G-AIVG – Viking 1B under restoration to static display by the Vintage Aircraft Club at EuroAirport Basel Mulhouse Freiburg in Basel. It crashed at Le Bourget Airport on 12 August 1958. It uses undercarriage and other parts from Vickers Valetta VX577 destroyed by fire 24 January 1997.

South Africa
 ZS-DKH – Viking 1A under restoration to static display at the South African Airways Museum Society in Germiston, Gauteng.

United Kingdom
 G-AGRU – Viking 1A under major long-term restoration while on outdoor display at the Brooklands Museum in Weybridge, Surrey.

Specifications (Viking 1B)

See also

References
Notes

Bibliography

 "Air Commerce: The Southall Accident: Report of the Public Inquiry". Flight, 21 August 1959, p. 58.
 Andrews, C.F. and E.B. Morgan. Vickers Aircraft since 1908. London:Putnam, 1988. .
 Bailey-Watson, C. B.  "Vickers Viking". Flight,  Vol. XLVII, No. 1900, 24 May 1945. pp. 556a–d, 557.
 Bridgman, Leonard. Jane's All The World's Aircraft 1951–52. London: Sampson Low, Marston & Company, Ltd, 1951.
 Chorlton, Martyn. "Database: Vickers VC.1 Viking". Aeroplane, Vol. 41, No. 12, Winter 2013. pp. 74–87. .
 Green, William and Gerald Pollinger. The Aircraft of the World. London: Macdonald, 1955.
 Jackson, A.J. British Civil Aircraft 1919–1972: Volume III. London: Putnam, 1988. .
 Martin, Bernard. The Viking, Valetta and Varsity. Tonbridge, Kent, UK: Air-Britain (Historians) Ltd., 1975. .
 Taylor, H.A. "The Viking... Vickers Commercial One". Air Enthusiast, No. 21, April–July 1983, pp. 38–48. .

External links

 "First Jet Transport" a 1948 article in Flight
 Progress - The Vickers "Nene/Viking" a 1949 advertisement in Flight for Rolls-Royce engines

1940s British airliners
VC.01 Viking
Mid-wing aircraft
Aircraft first flown in 1945
Twin piston-engined tractor aircraft